Francesco Frattini (born 18 January 1967, in Varese) is an Italian former road bicycle racer.

Major results

1995
1st, Rund um den Henninger-Turm
1st, Stage 6, Bicicleta Vasca
1st, Setmana Catalana de Ciclisme
1st, Stage 3
1996
1st, Stage 4, Tour of the Basque Country

External links

Palmarès by cyclingbase.com 

1967 births
Italian male cyclists
Living people
Cyclists from Varese